Andrija Šljukić (born 8 September 1995) is a Serbian rower.

He competed at the 2016 Summer Olympics in Rio de Janeiro, in the men's double sculls.

References

External links

1995 births
Living people
Serbian male rowers
Olympic rowers of Serbia
Rowers at the 2016 Summer Olympics